Spare Ribs is the eleventh studio album by English post-punk band Sleaford Mods. It was released on 15 January 2021 on the Rough Trade Records. Production was handled by Andrew Fearn. It features guest appearances from Amy Taylor (Amyl and the Sniffers) and Billy Nomates.

Critical reception

Spare Ribs was met with widespread acclaim from music critics. At Metacritic, which assigns a normalized rating out of 100 to reviews from mainstream publications, the album received an average score of 83 based on fifteen reviews. The aggregator AnyDecentMusic? has the critical consensus of the album at a 8.1 out of 10, based on twenty-one reviews.

Andrew Trendell of NME praised the album with a perfect 5 out of 5 stars, stating: "Here's your prescribed dose of reality with an unmistakable and intoxicating Sleaford Mods flavour. The extraordinary Spare Ribs is graffiti on a concrete wall; there's no manifesto, no easy answers and nowhere to hide". Laviea Thomas of Gigwise gave the album a perfect 10 out of 10 stars, calling it "faultless" adding "Sleaford Mods are out to save 2021 with their boisterous lyricism and hard-hitting production".

Sam Shepherd of musicOMH wrote: "Stripped back tracks, smart beats, punchy bass, and Williamson's dextrous barked delivery are all in place, and it seems that the band are in their dis/comfort zone". AllMusic's Heather Phares wrote: "even at the album's bleakest, Sleaford Mods never sound completely beaten down. Not even a global pandemic and repeated lockdowns can crush their spirit, and Spare Ribs feels like a hearty, timely, and well-deserved two fingers up to the powers that be". Susan Hansen of Clash wrote: "a raw snapshot perfectly designed to capture the ugliest sides of Britain, it's obvious that the duo is happy to knock at our doors once again. There's an ongoing need for this portrayal of relevant topics, and their sharpness and humour are as strong as ever". Kitty Empire of The Observer wrote: "Andrew Fearn's deathlessly inventive compositions stare you down, defying you to find them simplistic – the title track's turbo-charged electro, and the pointillist electronics of Top Room, are just two cases in point". Neil McCormick of The Telegraph wrote: "sweary, punky and bilious, Spare Ribs is unlikely to win over new converts but it is as good as anything in Sleaford Mods extensive oeuvre". Brenna Ehrlich of Rolling Stone wrote: "written partly during lockdown, the record features some of the least-annoying songs about the pandemic recorded since the initial outbreak in 2019. And that's heavy praise, considering some of the truly treacle-shellacked tracks that oozed into the zeitgeist last year".

In mixed reviews, Mark Beaumont of The Independent found the album "certainly reflects the personal and political overload of 2021, but half an hour in you'd be forgiven for scanning the horizon for your stop". Bella Martin of DIY wrote: "not one for anyone who's not already won over by the pair's particular charms".

Track listing

Charts

References

External links

2021 albums
Sleaford Mods albums
Rough Trade Records albums